Bad Liebenstein is a municipality and spa town in Wartburgkreis district of Thuringia, Germany.

Geography

Location
Bad Liebenstein is situated 25 km north of Meiningen, and 18 km south of Eisenach. It is located in the Mittelgebirge Thuringian Forest.

Neighbouring communities 
Since the amalgamation of 1 January 2013 the town has bordered on the following communities (clockwise from the southwest): Barchfeld-Immelborn, Moorgrund and Ruhla in Wartburgkreis, Brotterode-Trusetal and Breitungen/Werra in Schmalkalden-Meiningen district.

History
Schloss Altenstein, the summer residence of the Dukes of Saxe-Meiningen, is located within the municipality.

Since 1600 guests have come to recover. Famous spa guests included Queen Adelaide of Saxe-Meiningen, Albert Schweitzer, Gerhart Hauptmann, Franz Liszt and Charlotte von Stein.

References

External links

Spa towns in Germany
Wartburgkreis
Duchy of Saxe-Meiningen